Baruch Eduardo Luna García (born 7 January 1998) is a Mexican professional footballer who plays as a midfielder for Atlético San Luis Premier.

References

1998 births
Living people
Mexican footballers
Association football midfielders
Atlante F.C. footballers
Ascenso MX players
Liga Premier de México players
Tercera División de México players
Footballers from Veracruz
People from Tierra Blanca, Veracruz